Stachystemon polyandrus  is a plant in the Picrodendraceae family, found in the south-west of Western Australia.

It was first described in 1861 by Ferdinand von Mueller as Pseudanthus polyandrus, but was transferred to the genus  Stachystemon in 1873 by George Bentham.

The species epithet, polyandrus, derives from the  Greek poly- ("many") and aner - andros ("man"), and thus describes the plant as having many stamens.

Description
Bentham describes the plant:

References

External links 
 Stachystemon polyandrus occurrence data from Australasian Virtual Herbarium

Flora of Western Australia
Plants described in 1861
Taxa named by Ferdinand von Mueller
Picrodendraceae